Ghoul is an Indian horror streaming television miniseries based on the Arab folklore monster ghoul, and the second Netflix original from India, after Sacred Games. The series is written and directed by Patrick Graham and jointly produced by Jason Blum, Anurag Kashyap, Ryan Turek, Vikramaditya Motwane, Michael Hogan, Kilian Kerwin, John Penotti and Suraj Gohill under their respective banners Blumhouse Productions, Phantom Films and Ivanhoe Pictures.

The story is set in India in a dystopian future where fascism is at its top, and the story's main plot is the interrogation of a dreaded terrorist Ali Saeed in a secret government internment camp that ignites a series of horrifying and supernatural events in the aftermath. Radhika Apte plays the main character Nida Rahim supported by Manav Kaul, Ratnabali Bhattacharjee, S. M. Zaheer, Mahesh Balraj, Rohit Pathak and Mallhar Goenka in prominent roles.

The miniseries was conceived based on a dream Graham had had. Originally meant to be the first of 3 films in a deal between three production houses, Netflix acquired the production in February 2018 after Graham felt that a longer format would be better and had it turned into a miniseries. Ghoul released to positive reviews from critics, with praise to the performances and storyline.

Premise 
Nida Rahim (Radhika Apte) is a newly recruited military officer who is fiercely loyal to the authoritarian regime and is ready to go to any limit to prove her faith in the existing system to cleanse the society for a better future. She is appointed at a covert military detention centre to interrogate Ali Saeed (Mahesh Balraj), the most dreaded terrorist who has been recently captured and brought in for interrogation. However, he turns the tables on his interrogators, exposing their most shameful secrets. Rahim comes to the conclusion that Ali Saeed is not from this world and is possessed by some supernatural entity.

Cast 
 Radhika Apte as Nida Rahim
 Manav Kaul as Colonel Sunil Dacunha
 S. M. Zaheer as Shahnawaz Rahim
 Ratnabali Bhattacharjee as Major Laxmi Das
 Mahesh Balraj as Ali Saeed
 Resh Lamba as Sinister Man
 Mallhar Goenka as Subedar Babloo
 Rohit Pathak as Captain Lamba 
 Robin Das as Maulvi (Muslim Cleric)
 Surender Thakur as Faulad Singh

Development
Mumbai-based British filmmaker Patrick Graham, who has made a few short films, saw a dream where an inmate enters a prison and manages to terrify the guards and the fellow prisoners. Graham wrote down the dream and developed it into a script. He also read several CIA documents about torture techniques used after 9/11 and at Camp X-Ray and the reports of military centres in Kashmir. He had a dream about being in an Abu Ghraib-like torture centre in Iraq. And then he thought, "‘What if an inmate came in and he was scarier than the place, scarier than the guards, scarier than the other prisoners and there’s something weird about him?" On 3 September 2014 Blumhouse Productions, Phantom Films and Ivanhoe Pictures announced a partnership deal for creating local language horror films in India. The first of three films from the partnership is Ghoul written and directed by Patrick Graham. Radhika Apte and Manav Kaul are starring in the film. Graham later felt a longer format would do more justice to the story. It was supposed to be a film and was later turned into a three episode miniseries after Netflix came on board in February 2018. Kaul called it a "blessing in disguise" as it gave them the breathing room to add a bit more backstory.

Graham said that he wanted to take a "monster from mythology that hasn't been seen before" as he felt "Zombies, vampires and werewolves have been done to death." While reading on Arabic folklore's, he came across the ghoul, which he felt "fit perfectly because of its characteristics". He said that some back story for the characters was added once the film was turned into a miniseries. The dialogue was written by Kartik Krishnan. Some scenes were filmed before Phantom Films, Blumhouse Productions and Ivanhoe Pictures began talks with Netflix. Graham said he was always fascinated by dystopian futures and decided to create an "oppressive, claustrophobic story". He researched the origins of ghoul in Arabic folklore and drew on a couple of things: the Jinn mythology and how one can summon it but it may or may not be on your side, and supernatural powers such as being able to see people's guilt and using that against them. He said that the "main bulk of the story came first, and the atmosphere we wanted to create came after." Kaul played the role of Colonel Sunil Dacunha, who is a patriotic person and has a strained relationship with his family. Apte played the role of newly appointed interrogator, Nida Rahim. Apte was drawn to Rahim's belief system, the strength of her faith, and her way of thinking, which she found to be "quite the opposite of what my way of thinking is". She also liked "her investigation into her own life".

S. M. Zaheer plays the role of Shahnawaz Rahim, who is the father of Nida Rahim. Ratnabali Bhattacharjee essays the role of Laxmi, a prejudiced interrogation officer.

Production 
Principal photography began in June 2016. The series was shot in 14 hours a day for over a month in a place which Apte described as a "leaky, damp, and horrible smelling place with no sunlight". Graham wrote the script in English and had the dialogues translated to Hindi. Since he is a Britisher, Graham faced some problems while filming Ghoul, as the crew consisted of mostly Hindi speakers. He talked about the scene to actors in English and rehearsed it. He said: "I had two people sat with me at the monitors and monitor the dialogues and make sure the intonation and how things were being said sounded correct." Graham minimised the use of jump scares in the series as he felt they "diffuse tension" and so "you need to limit how often you rely on them." The cast did several one-on-one sessions and a 15-day rehearsal of scenes. Kaul did the extensive military training and also worked on how to talk, walk, hold the gun like a military personnel. Jay Oza served as the director of photography and Nitin Baid is the editor.

The location of the filming was at the Tulip Star Hotel in Mumbai.  Parts of the hotel were made to look like the interrogation chamber.

Episodes

Marketing and release
The miniseries was released on 24 August 2018 by Netflix. They advertised by painting a ghoul symbol over already existing posters of Sacred Games in India. The series was screened on 22 August 2018 in Mumbai.

Reception
The review aggregated website Rotten Tomatoes reported that 86% of critics have given the series a positive review based on 14 reviews, with an average rating of 6.14/10. The site's critics consensus reads, "Short, spooky, and surprisingly poignant, Ghoul concentrated brand of horror is familiar, but effective." Sampada Sharma of The Indian Express called the series "unnerving" that "tackles social change vis a vis religion in an effective and dramatic way." Swetha Ramakrishnan of Firstpost called the series "atmospheric, partly disturbing but fully gripping." Adamya Sharma of Digit wrote: "These sort of shows demand the kind of critical thinking that audiences in India desperately need to sift invigorating content from the clutter of soap operas." Saraswati Datar of The News Minute opined, "In a global environment where regimes in India and abroad are trying to make countries 'great' again or bring back 'ache din', Ghoul sounds a warning bell of the dangerous consequences of state sponsored intolerance".

Sushant S Mohan of News18 praised Bhattacharjee and Balraj's performances and called them the "surprise package". He further called it an "innovative" series despite its predictability. Dipti Kharude of The Quint wrote: "The three-part Indian original horror miniseries may not have been successful in spinning a flawless and chilling yarn but breathes new life in the horror genre with its subversive plot." Rohan Naahar of Hindustan Times praised the series and wrote: "The elements are all there - a blazingly original idea, Jay Oza’s claustrophobic and atmospheric visuals, and a strong, simmering performance by Netflix’s favourite Indian child, Radhika Apte - but Ghoul, the show, much like its namesake demon, suffers from an identity crisis." Akhil Arora of NDTV praised Balraj's performance the pacing but felt the series is "let down by its reliance on cliched genre writing such as characters behaving stupidly for the sake of the plot or falling prey to narrative convenience towards the end to drive up the tension."

Siddhant Adlakha of IGN called it a "gloriously depraved work" and wrote: "It’s the kind of horror where security cameras and sound visualizers build to scares, rather than delivering them at a distance." Saibal Chatterjee of NDTV praised the performances of the cast and wrote that the series is "bolstered by acting of the highest quality". Kayla Kumari Upadhyay of Thrillist wrote: "[..] Ghoul pulls from Arabic folklore to craft a tense, tightly edited monster movie with a fantastic leading woman."
Suhani Singh of India Today called it a "camp horror albeit not a thrilling one." Nandini Ramnath of Scroll.in felt that the "characters are as unconvincing as the treatment" and said that the series is "neither scary nor convincing". Ankur Pathak of HuffPost felt the writing was "expository" as well as the dialogues were "over-written and verbose." He however praised the background score. Alaka Sahani of The Indian Express called it "a fine example of using cross-cultural elements to aid storytelling." She further wrote: "This subversive show, can be a precursor to content that not only offer chills but also effectively deliver socially-relevant tales."

Melissa Camacho of Common Sense Media opined that the series "feels a bit uneven, with some segments focusing more on political commentary" and felt that the backstories of characters other than Nida were "rich with potential", but unexplored. She concluded, "[T]here's an interesting story here, and one that is worth the watch if you are looking for a compelling, truly scary viewing experience". Chuck Bowen of Slant Magazine felt that by converting a feature film into a miniseries, the series "constantly dips into redundant exposition, all the while eliding emotional textures that might complicate the smooth delivery of unoriginal plotting." A review carried by the IANS called it "all atmosphere, no substance". Tanul Thakur of The Wire praised the series and cited it as "cinematically rich, politically aware – that, one hopes, will set a precedent." Raja Sen wrote: "Despite compelling cinematography and very slick sound design, this is a derivative (and predictable) B-movie that has been stretched—for no reason I can think other than risking the wrath of ticket-bearing theatregoers—into a dull three-parter." The Editorial team of Thousand Miles wrote, " In short, Ghoul is a horrifying tale with a twisting plot that narrates a story magnificently deeper than the random average haunted tales."

References

External links 
 

Indian television series distributed by Netflix
2010s horror television series
Hindi-language Netflix original programming
Indian mystery television series
Indian action television series
Indian thriller television series
Indian horror fiction television series
2018 Indian television series debuts
2010s Indian television miniseries
Dystopian television series
Demons in television
Genies in television